Jere Myllyniemi (born January 24, 1983) is a Finnish former professional ice hockey goaltender. He is currently working as a goaltending coach of KOOVEE of Mestis.

Career
Myllyniemi began his career with KOOVEE in the Suomi-sarja. He made his SM-liiga debut for Blues during the 2002–03 SM-liiga season. He moves to Sweden in 2005 to play for Rögle BK in the HockeyAllsvenskan for one season. He returned to Finland the following season with Lukko.

In the 2007-08 season, Myllyniemi returned to Blues for a brief spell before going back to Sweden with Luleå HF of the Elitserien. He then joined Rögle BK for the 2008–09 Elitserien season, but left the team on December 27, 2008 and moved to Leksands IF.

Myllyniemi came back to the SM-liiga in 2009 with SaiPa as their starting goaltender. He moved to Pelicans in 2012 and remained for three seasons before joining HPK in 2015. In the 2016–17 Liiga season, he had brief spells with Ilves, Pelicans and HIFK.

References

External links
 

1983 births
Living people
Espoo Blues players
Finnish ice hockey goaltenders
HIFK (ice hockey) players
Hokki players
HPK players
Imatran Ketterä players
Ilves players
Jokipojat players
Kiekko-Vantaa players
KOOVEE players
Lahti Pelicans players
Leksands IF players
Lempäälän Kisa players
Lukko players
Luleå HF players
People from Kangasala
Rögle BK players
SaiPa players
HC Salamat players
SaPKo players
TuTo players
Sportspeople from Pirkanmaa